St Raphael's Church may refer to:

Canada 
 St. Raphael the Archangel Church (Montreal)

Colombia 
 St Raphael's Church, San Rafael

Italy 
 San Raffaele, Naples
 Angelo San Raffaele, Venice

United Kingdom 
 St Raphael's Church, Surbiton

United States

Hawaii 
 Saint Raphael Catholic Church (Koloa, Hawaii)

New York 
 Church of Sts. Cyril & Methodius and St. Raphael in Manhattan, originally named Church of St. Raphael

North Carolina 
 St. Raphael the Archangel Catholic Church (Raleigh, North Carolina)

Ohio 
 St. Raphael's Catholic Church (Springfield, Ohio)